Sumit Nagal was the defending champion but chose not to defend his title.

Sebastián Báez won the title after defeating Thiago Monteiro 6–4, 6–0 in the final.

Seeds

Draw

Finals

Top half

Bottom half

References

External links
Main draw
Qualifying draw

Challenger de Buenos Aires - 1
2021 Singles